The Altmann is a mountain in the Appenzell Alps, located on the border between the cantons of Appenzell Innerrhoden and St. Gallen. It is situated in the massif of the Alpstein north of Wildhaus (St. Gallen), a few kilometres from the Säntis.

The Altmann is a steep limestone tower, which rises about 1000 metres over the valleys of the Alpstein. The normal route starts at Rotsteinpass (2,120 metres) on the north-west side and is considered an easy climb.

References

External links

Altmann on Summitpost
Altmann on Hikr
 Spherical panorama of Altmann

Mountains of the Alps
Mountains of Switzerland
Mountains of the canton of St. Gallen
Mountains of Appenzell Innerrhoden
Appenzell Alps
Appenzell Innerrhoden–St. Gallen border